The Church of Our Lady of Damascus is a Catholic church in Valletta, in Malta, observing the Byzantine rite. It is also called Id-Damaxxena.

Original Church
The original church was built upon the request of Giovanni Calamia to house the icon of Our Lady of Damascus brought over from Rhodes by the Knights of St John when they were expelled from the island by the Ottoman Empire. By 1580 the church was finished. In 1587 the Icon of Our Lady of Damascus was solemnly transferred from Vittoriosa to the new church.

Present Church
On March 24, 1942, during one of the bombings of Valletta, the Church of Our Lady of Damascus was hit and completely destroyed. Many   icons were lost under the debris of the church. It was because of the initiative of Italo-Albanian Papàs Gjergji Schirò from Piana degli Albanesi, that the Church was rebuilt and reconsecrated on August 15, 1951 by Archbishop Georgios Halavazis.

Present use
The church is mainly used by the Catholic community of the "Greek rite" of Malta for Divine Liturgy. The church is also used by the Italo-Albanian Catholic Church, and now the Melkite Greek Catholic Church, by Armenian Orthodox Church, by Russian Orthodox, Ukrainian Orthodox and Belarusian Orthodox.

See also

Culture of Malta
History of Malta
List of Churches in Malta
Religion in Malta

References

1580 establishments in Europe
Buildings and structures in Valletta
Eastern Christianity in Malta
16th-century establishments in Malta
Byzantine architecture in Malta
Greek Catholic churches in Malta